Abdulatif Ould Abdullah is an Algerian writer. He was born in 1988 in the city of Mostaganem. He studied architecture at the University of Algiers.

He has written three novels: 
 Out of Control (2016)
 Flaunting Finery (2018) 
 The Eye of Hammurabi (2020)

He was shortlisted for the Arabic Booker Prize in 2021.

References

Algerian writers
1988 births
Living people
21st-century Algerian people